Miss Spain 2009 was the 49th Miss Spain pageant and was held on July 18, 2009. There were 52 candidates for the national title. The winner represented Spain at Miss Universe 2009. The First Runner-up went to Miss World 2009. The Second Runner-up went to Miss Earth 2009. The Third runner-up to Miss World 2010 and the Fourth runner-up  went to Miss International 2009. One of he finalists to Reina Hispanoamericana 2009.

Results

Special Awards
 Best Face - Ana Miranda (Las Palmas)
 Best Look - Melody Mir (Islas Baleares)
 Best Provincial costume - Noelia Manzanon (Almería)
 Miss Congeniality (voted by Miss Spain contestants) - Ara Jurado (Córdoba)
 Miss Internet - Ana Miranda (Las Palmas)
 Miss Photogenic (voted by press reporters) - Carmen González (Huelva) 
 Miss Air Europa - Melania Santiago (Málaga)
 Miss Cabello Bonito - María Prado (Asturias) 
 Miss Centro Clínico Menorca - María Bastarreche (Segovia)
 Miss Corona Extra - Lorena Pérez (Barcelona)
 Miss diseñadora de moda flamenca, Sara de Benítez - Desireé Panal (Cádiz)
 Miss Liska - Lorena Pérez (Barcelona)
 Miss Oasis Hotels & Resort - Melody Mir (Islas Baleares)
 Miss Oriflame - Fátima Jiménez (Sevilla)
 Miss Toro Watch - Estíbaliz Pereira (A Coruña)
 Miss Turismo - Tamara Vera (Murcia)

Delegates

Trivia
 Miss Islas Baleares is the only one from her family born in Mallorca, Spain. Her family is from the Santiago de los Caballeros, Dominican Republic.

External links
 Official Website
 Resultados Oficiales

Miss Spain
2009 in Mexico